John McCole (18 September 1936 – 1982) was a Scottish professional footballer who played in Scotland, England, Ireland, Wales and the United States.

Career
Born in Glasgow, Scotland, McCole began his career with Vale of Leven before signing a professional contract with Falkirk in 1956. McCole moved to England in 1958 to play with Bradford City, Leeds United (where he scored 45 goals in 78 league appearances, but was unable to prevent Leeds from being relegated from the First Division; McCole also set a club record by scoring four goals in the League Cup match against Brentford before returning to Bradford in October 1961) and Rotherham United, before spending a year in Ireland with Shelbourne. McCole returned to Britain to play for Newport County – a Welsh team playing in the English league – before returning to Ireland to play with Cork Hibernians and Dundalk.

McCole also spent the summer of 1961 in the United States with the New York Americans, scoring seven goals in the process.

References

External links

Profile at LeedsFans,org

1936 births
1982 deaths
Scottish footballers
League of Ireland players
Falkirk F.C. players
Bradford City A.F.C. players
Leeds United F.C. players
Rotherham United F.C. players
Shelbourne F.C. players
Newport County A.F.C. players
Dundalk F.C. players
Cork Hibernians F.C. players
Footballers from Glasgow
Association football forwards
Vale of Leven F.C. players
Date of death missing
Scottish Football League players
English Football League players
Scottish Junior Football Association players
Scottish expatriate footballers
Scottish expatriate sportspeople in Ireland
Scottish expatriate sportspeople in the United States
Expatriate soccer players in the United States
Expatriate association footballers in the Republic of Ireland